Carsten Baumann may refer to:
 Carsten Baumann (footballer, born 1946), German football player
 Carsten Baumann (footballer, born 1974), German football player